Viktor Kireyev (born 5 May 1987) is a Russian handball player for Füchse Berlin and the Russian national team.

He competed at the 2016 European Men's Handball Championship.

References

External links

1987 births
Living people
Russian male handball players
Sportspeople from Penza Oblast
HC Motor Zaporizhia players
Expatriate handball players
Russian expatriate sportspeople in Ukraine